The Kingdom of Denmark has only one official language, Danish, the national language of the Danish people, but there are several minority languages spoken, namely Faroese, German, and Greenlandic.

A large majority (about 86%) of Danes also speak English as a second language; it is mandatory for Danish students to learn from first grade in the public elementary schools, by far the most popular option in the country. In the 1st (or 3rd, depends on the school) grade of folkeskole, a third language option is given, usually German or French. The vast majority pick German (about 47% of Danes report being able to speak conversational German). The third most widely understood foreign language is Swedish, with about 13% of Danes reporting to be able to speak it.

Officially recognized minority languages

Faroese

Faroese, a North Germanic language like Danish, is the primary language of the Faroe Islands, a self-governing territory of the Kingdom. It is also spoken by some Faroese immigrants to mainland Denmark. Faroese is similar to Icelandic, and also retains many features of Old Norse, from which it is derived.

Greenlandic 
Greenlandic or "Kalaallisut" is not only the national language, but is now "the official language in Greenland" by virtue of Act no. 473, adopted by parliament 12 June 2009, the Act on Greenland Self-Government. Greenlandic belongs to the Eskimo–Aleut languages; it is closely related to the Inuit languages in Canada, such as Inuktitut, and entirely unrelated to Danish.

See also
 Minority languages of Denmark
 Danish dialects

References